Nabukelevu is a volcano located on the southwest portion of Kadavu Island in Fiji. It has formed lava domes 

Nabukelevu is the only area in west Kadavu Island that retains extensive old-growth forest. A  area centred on Nabukelevu is the Nabukelevu Important Bird Area. It supports populations of vulnerable Collared Petrel and Crimson shining parrot, and near threatened Whistling fruit dove and Kadavu fantail. The Collared Petrel breeding site and unique landscape of the mountain contribute to its national significance as outlined in Fiji's Biodiversity Strategy and Action Plan.

References

Volcanoes of Fiji
Kadavu Group
Preliminary Register of Sites of National Significance in Fiji
Important Bird Areas of Fiji